Cadet Girl is a 1941 comedy film directed by Ray McCarey and written by Stanley Rauh and H.W. Hanemann. The film stars Carole Landis, George Montgomery, Shepperd Strudwick, William Tracy, Janis Carter and Robert Lowery. The film was released on November 28, 1941, by 20th Century Fox. The film was screened at Cinecon 46  in 2010.

Plot
A West Point cadet falls in love with a girl who sings in his brother's band.

Cast
Carole Landis as Gene Baxter
George Montgomery as Tex Mallory
Shepperd Strudwick as Bob Mallory 
William Tracy as The Runt
Janis Carter as Mary Moore
Robert Lowery as Walton
Basil Walker as Red
Charles Tannen as Jimmy
Chick Chandler as Benny Burns
Otto Han as Foo
Irving Bacon as Train conductor
Jayne Hazard as Ona
Edna Mae Jones as Mona
Charles Trowbridge as Col. Bradley
Marguerite Whitten as Margaret aka Brenda

References

External links
 

1941 films
1941 romantic comedy films
American black-and-white films
American romantic comedy films
Films directed by Ray McCarey
Films set in the United States Military Academy
20th Century Fox films
1940s English-language films
1940s American films